The Pauza P-50 was a gas-operated, semi-automatic anti-materiel rifle developed by Robert Pauza. It was manufactured between 1990 and 1997, and sold by Pauza Specialties of Baytown, Texas; later versions were never produced by Freshour Manufacturing, a company in Texas City, Texas. The rifle was developed to be a competitor to similar products by Barrett Firearms Manufacturing, although only 36 P-50s were produced.

Variants
The rifle was produced in variants consisting of a sniper rifle and a carbine rifle, both in .50 caliber.

References

Sniper rifles of the United States
Semi-automatic rifles
.50 BMG sniper rifles
Anti-materiel rifles